The Wavy Range is a small mountain range east of Murtle Lake in east-central British Columbia, Canada. It has an area of 102 km2 and is a subrange of the Cariboo Mountains which in turn form part of the Columbia Mountains.

See also
List of mountain ranges

References

Cariboo Mountains